Windward Express Airways is based at Princess Juliana International Airport (SXM), Sint Maarten.  It provides Air Charter and cargo services throughout the Eastern Caribbean.

Fleet and Services

Windward Express operates three Britten-Norman Islanders using the STOL (Short Take-Off and Landing) capabilities which for operation at short runways such as St. Barths (Saint-Barthélemy), Baillif, Le Saints and Saba.

External links
Windward Express
Windward Express Islander Picture

Airlines of the Netherlands Antilles
Airlines of Sint Maarten